Gregory Daniel (born November 8, 1994 in Denver) is an American cyclist who last rode for . He was a member of UCI WorldTeam  in 2017 and 2018.

Major results
Sources:

2011
 1st  Team pursuit, National Track Championships
2012
 1st  Time trial, National Junior Road Championships
2013
 1st Stage 3 Arden Challenge
2015
 1st  Mountains classification Tour of Utah
 National Under–23 Road Championships
2nd Road race
3rd Time trial
2016
 1st  Road race, National Road Championships
 1st  Overall Tour de Beauce
1st Stage 5
 1st Stage 1 (TTT) Olympia's Tour
2018
 1st Mount Evans Hill Climb

References

External links

1994 births
Living people
People from Denver
American male cyclists
Cyclists from Colorado